The skink tegu (Leposoma scincoides) is a species of lizard in the family Gymnophthalmidae. It is endemic to Brazil.

References

Leposoma
Reptiles of Brazil
Endemic fauna of Brazil
Reptiles described in 1825
Taxa named by Johann Baptist von Spix